John Williamson is the debut studio album by Australian country music artist John Williamson. It was released in 1970.

Background and release
In 1970, Williamson entered New Faces, an Australian talent show, with the self-penned track "Old Man Emu". Williamson won the contest and signed with the newly formed label Fable Records. "Old Man Emu" was released in May 1970 which peaked at number 4 on the Kent Music Report and was certified gold in Australia Williamson wrote and recorded his debut studio which was released in mid-1970 but failed to chart. It was the first album released by the label.

Track listing

Release history

References

1970 debut albums
John Williamson (singer) albums